Southview High School may refer to:

South View High School in Hope Mills, North Carolina
Southview High School (Lorain, Ohio) in Lorain, Ohio
Sylvania Southview High School in Sylvania, Ohio